Mired Jani (born 13 March 1990) is an Albanian professional basketball player who plays for BC Tirana in the Albanian Basketball Superliga as well as the Albania national team.

References

1990 births
Living people
Albanian men's basketball players
Point guards
Basketball players from Tirana